Alison is a semi-rural suburb of the Central Coast region of New South Wales, Australia, located on the north bank of the Wyong River  northwest of the regional centre of Wyong. It is part of the  local government area.

It is named for Alison Homestead, located in Cape Road, the main building of which was extensively damaged by Arson in the early hours of 11 December 2011.

References

Suburbs of the Central Coast (New South Wales)